Silicon Mountain, also known as the "Silicon Flatirons" is a nickname given to the tech hub in the Denver, Colorado metropolitan area and Colorado Springs, Colorado metropolitan area. The name is analogous to Silicon Valley, but refers to the Rocky Mountains beyond the skyline.  Denver startups raised $401 million in 2015, and Boulder startups raised $183 million in 2015.

Startups
SolidFire
Zayo Group
Dot Hill Systems
AlchemyAPI

Venture capital

Incubators
The Founder Institute
Techstars
Innovation Pavilion

Fortune 500 Companies
 Dish Network
 DaVita Inc.
 Liberty Interactive
 Level 3 Communications
 Ball Corp.
 Newmont Mining
 Western Union
 Envision Healthcare
 CH2M Hill

See also
Denver Tech Center
Northern Colorado Economic Development Corporation
List of companies with Denver area operations
List of places with "Silicon" names

References

High-technology business districts in the United States
Information technology places